Mannitol hexanitrate is a powerful explosive.  Physically, it is a powdery solid at normal temperature ranges, with density of 1.73 g/cm3. The chemical name is hexanitromannitol and it is also known as nitromannite, MHN, and nitromannitol, and by the trademarks Nitranitol and Mannitrin. It is more stable than nitroglycerin, and it is used in detonators.

Mannitol hexanitrate is a secondary explosive formed by the nitration of mannitol, a sugar alcohol. The product is used in medicine as a vasodilator and as an explosive in blasting caps. Its sensitivity is high, particularly at high temperatures (> 75 °C) where it is slightly more sensitive than nitroglycerine. Nitromannite is a class B explosive.

The production of pure MHN is not a trivial task, since most preparations will yield a mixture of MHN and lower esters (pentanitrate and lower).

See also
 Pentaerythritol tetranitrate (PETN)
 Xylitol pentanitrate
 Erythritol tetranitrate (ETN)
 Ethylene glycol dinitrate
 Methyl nitrate

References

 The Chemistry of Powder and Explosives, Tenney L. Davis

External links
 Powerlabs.org

Explosive chemicals
Nitrate esters
Sugar alcohol explosives